Johnny O'Leary (6 June 1923 – 9 February 2004) was a noted Irish traditional musician from Sliabh Luachra who played the button accordion.

Life
O'Leary was born in Maulykeavane, which is about halfway between Killarney and Ballydesmond, in the centre of Sliabh Luachra, renowned for its traditional music. He started picking out tunes on the melodeon at the age of five and by his early teens, he was regularly playing for local dances. He played the Paolo Soprani box in C#/D tuning, using the "press and draw" style. He learned from Padraig O'Keeffe, along with Denis Murphy and his sister Julia Clifford. He embarked on a musical career that would result in many recordings, radio and television appearances and would win him several accolades and awards. His last national achievement was a TG4 Hall of Fame award.

While a teenager, he struck up a friendship with Denis Murphy that lasted 37 years, ending with Murphy's death. Together they played at Dan O'Connell's pub in Knocknagree, along with musicians such as O'Leary's daughter Ellen (on tin whistle), Kathleen O'Keefe (whistle) and Michael Duggan (fiddle). Dancing was provided by the Knocknagree Set Dancers.

The music of Sliabh Luachra is characterized by a predominance of dance tunes such as polkas and slides over the more obvious jigs, reels and hornpipes. While its slow airs are in the minority when compared with other parts of the country, the tunes resonate with a shrill sadness and poignant humanity. Many of Johnny O’Leary’s polkas, slides and barn-dances are quite unusual and little known.

The collector and publisher of Irish traditional music Breandán Breathnach visited Sliabh Luachra for many years and collected music from O'Leary. He intended to publish this material because he regarded O'Leary's playing as preserving the style and repertoire of the area. After Breathnach's death in 1985, Terry Moylan took up the work and published his collection of O'Leary's music in 1994. According to broadcaster Ciarán Mac Mathúna, who first met Johnny in 1955, he had a huge repertoire, with up to 1,500 tunes stored away.

A bronze life-size statue of O'Leary was unveiled in Killarney Town Centre by John O'Donoghue, T.D., Minister for Arts, Sports and Tourism, on 28 April 2007.

Recordings
 Music from Sliabh Luachra Volume 5: Johnny O'Leary -. Music for the Set Topic /Ossian OSSCD 25 Recorded 1976-77.
 An Calmfhear/The Trooper Gael Linn CEFC 132 / CEFCD 132, 1989
 Johnny O'Leary of Sliabh Luachra: Dance Music from the Cork/Kerry Border, recorded December 1995. Craft Recordings, Dublin - CRCS01
 (with Paudie O'Connor) The County Bounds Ossian, 1999

Bibliography
Johnny O'Leary of Sliabh Luachra: Dance Music from the Cork/Kerry Border, Terry Moylan (editor) Lilliput Press, Dublin, 1994 (contains 348 of Johnny O'Leary's tunes).

References

External links
 Obituary on Rambling House
 Johnny and Ellen O'Leary playing Kerry polkas
 

Irish accordionists
People from County Kerry
1923 births
2004 deaths
20th-century accordionists
Topic Records artists